The  are a Japanese women's softball team based in Toyota, Aichi. The Red Terriers compete in the Japan Diamond Softball League (JD.League) as a member of the league's West Division.

History
The Red Terriers were founded in 1948, as Toyota softball team.

The Japan Diamond Softball League (JD.League) was founded in 2022, and the Red Terriers became part of the new league as a member of the West Division.

Roster

Notes

References

External links
 
 Toyota Red Terriers - JD.League

Japan Diamond Softball League
Women's softball teams in Japan
Sports teams in Aichi Prefecture